Davidson Street is a streetcar station in Charlotte, North Carolina. The at-grade island platform on East Trade Street is a stop along the CityLynx Gold Line and serves various government agencies and facilities, including the Charlotte-Mecklenburg Government Center (CMGC).

Location 
Davidson Street station is located at the intersection of East Trade and Davidson Streets, in Uptown Charlotte. In the immediate is Charlotte City Hall, Charlotte-Mecklenburg Police Department Main Headquarters, and the Federal Reserve Bank of Richmond's Charlotte Branch; while nearby is the CMGC and First Baptist Charlotte.

History 
As part of the initial  Gold Line, construction on Davidson Street began in December 2013. The station opened to the public on July 14, 2015, with a low platform configuration that was used for heritage streetcars. In June 2019, as part of phase two, streetcar service was replaced by the CityLynx Connector bus; at which time the station's island platform was closed off so it can be raised to accommodate the level boarding for modern streetcar vehicles. Though it was slated to reopen in early-2020, various delays pushed out the reopening till mid-2021. The station reopened to the public on August 30, 2021, at which time the CityLynx Connector bus was discontinued.

Station layout
The station consists of an island platform with two passenger shelters; a crosswalk and ramp provide platform access from East Trade Street. The station's passenger shelters house two art installations by Nancy O’Neil. The windscreens honor those who work to keep the city safe, featuring a collage of historical maps, photos, and manuscripts on glass.

References

External links
 
 Davidson Street

Lynx Gold Line stations
Railway stations in the United States opened in 2015